Come Fly with Me is a 1963 British comedy film about three beautiful international air hostesses looking for romance and excitement. The film has dramatic or soap opera elements to it, and was a vehicle for glamorizing the Jet Age and the prestige, adventure and romance that came with being an air hostess. It is based on Bernard Glemser's 1960 chick-lit novel Girl on a Wing, which was published again in 1969 under the title The Fly Girls.

Directed by Henry Levin, the film stars Dolores Hart, Hugh O'Brian, Karlheinz Böhm, Pamela Tiffin, Karl Malden, and Lois Nettleton.

Plot
Three air hostesses, based in New York City, are working for the fictional airline Polar Atlantic Airways. The three make regular flights from New York City to Paris and Vienna. Along the way, air hostess Donna Stuart (Dolores Hart), meets Baron Franz Von Elzingen (Karlheinz Böhm), an impoverished Austrian baron who turns out to be a diamond smuggler. "Southern belle" Carol Brewster (Pamela Tiffin) develops a crush on the plane's First Officer Ray Winsley (Hugh O'Brian), who is having an affair with a married woman (Dawn Addams). The third air hostess, Hilda "Bergie" Bergstrom (Lois Nettleton), gets noticed by a multi-millionaire widower from Texas named Walter Lucas (Karl Malden).

Cast
 Dolores Hart as Donna Stuart
 Hugh O'Brian as First Officer Ray Winsley (Co-Pilot)
 Karlheinz Böhm as Baron Franz Von Elzingen (credited as Karl Boehm)
 Pamela Tiffin as Carol Brewster
 Karl Malden as Walter Lucas
 Lois Nettleton as Hilda "Bergie" Bergstrom
 Dawn Addams as Katie Rinard
 Victor Rietti as Passenger (cameo)
 John Crawford as Pilot
 Andrew Cruickshank as Cardwell
 James Dobson as Flight Engineer Teddy Shepard
 Robert Easton as Navigator
 Maurice Marsac as Monsieur Rinard
 Lois Maxwell as Gwen Sandley
 Richard Wattis as Oliver Garson
 Guido Wieland as Vienna Policeman

Production notes
Henry Levin was signed to direct in April 1962.

The film was known in production as Champagne Flight, The Friendliest Girls in the World and Girl on a Wing.

The film was shot in Panavision and Metrocolor during 1962 in New York City, Paris, Versailles, Vienna, and the Woerther See with studio interiors shot at MGM British Studios in Borehamwood, England. The shoot took 12 weeks.

It filmed at the same time as Follow the Boys.

It premiered in the United States on 27 March 1963.

Glemsser wrote a follow-up novel in 1972, titled The Super-Jet Girls. It was not made into a film however.

Critical reception
Variety wrote upon the film's release, "Sometimes one performance can save a picture and in Come Fly with Me it's an engaging and infectious one by Pamela Tiffin. The production has other things going for it like an attractive cast, slick pictorial values and smart, stylish direction by Henry Levin, but at the base of all this sheer sheen lies a frail, frivolous and featherweight storyline that, in trying to take itself too seriously, flies into dramatic air pockets and crosscurrents that threaten to send the entire aircraft into a tailspin."

See also
Boeing-Boeing, 1962 play
Boeing Boeing, 1965 film version of the play
Coffee, Tea or Me?, 1967 novel
The Stewardesses, 1969 film
Flying High, 1978 TV series
The Crew, 1995 TV series
View from the Top, 2003 film
Pan Am, 2011 TV series

References

External links
 
 
 
 

1963 films
1963 comedy films
British comedy films
British aviation films
Films based on British novels
Films directed by Henry Levin
Films produced by Anatole de Grunwald
Films scored by Lyn Murray
Films set in Austria
Films set in France
British films set in New York City
Films shot in Hertfordshire
Films shot in New York City
Films shot in Paris
Films shot in Vienna
Metro-Goldwyn-Mayer films
Films about flight attendants
Films set in airports
Films set on airplanes
Films with screenplays by William Roberts (screenwriter)
Films shot at MGM-British Studios
Jet Age
1960s English-language films
1960s British films